Vietnam Atomic Energy Commission (abbreviation VAEC) is an agency under The Ministry of Science and Technology of Vietnam government with mission of studying formulation of policies, strategies, planning and plans for atomic energy development in Vietnam; conducting fundamental and applied research on nuclear science and technology, nuclear reactor technology, nuclear reactor fuel and material, radiation protection and nuclear safety, radioactive waste treatment and management technology.

Missions

History

Organisation

Leaders

Branch

See also

 Nuclear energy in Vietnam

References

Nuclear power
Radiation protection organizations
Nuclear technology in Vietnam
Scientific organizations based in Vietnam